Aldo di Cillo Pagotto S.S.S. (16 September 1949 – 14 April 2020) was a Brazilian Catholic  archbishop.

Biography
Pagotto was born in Brazil, 16 September 1949. He was ordained to the priesthood in 1977. He served as coadjutor bishop of the Roman Catholic Diocese of Sobral, Brazil, in 1996 and 1997 and as bishop of the Sobral Diocese from 1997 to 2004. He then became archbishop of the Roman Catholic Archdiocese of Paraíba, Brazil, from 2004 to 2016. He died in Fortaleza from COVID-19.

Notes

1949 births
2020 deaths
21st-century Roman Catholic archbishops in Brazil
20th-century Roman Catholic bishops in Brazil
Deaths from the COVID-19 pandemic in Ceará
Roman Catholic archbishops of Paraíba
Roman Catholic bishops of Sobral